Demolition of the Monument at San Stefano is a 1914 Turkish documentary film directed by former army officer Fuat Uzkınay. It is the oldest known Turkish-made film.

The documentary showed the demolition of the Russian victory monument erected in San Stefano (the modern Yeşilköy quarter of Istanbul) after the Russo-Turkish War (1877–1878), which ended with the Treaty of San Stefano (following the Congress of Berlin in 1878 it was superseded by the Treaty of Berlin). The reason for the monument's demolition was the declaration of war between the Ottoman Empire and Russian Empire in 1914, during World War I.

The last surviving copy of the film is believed to have been lost around 1941 and no known copies exist today in archives (only a number of photos of the event have survived).

External links
 Ayastefanos'taki Rus Abidesinin Yıkılışı at IMDb
 http://www.turkeyswar.com/homefront/cinema.html

References

Turkish documentary films
Lost Turkish films
1914 films
1914 documentary films
Black-and-white documentary films
Russo-Turkish War (1877–1878)
Turkish black-and-white films
Turkish silent films
Turkish propaganda films
1914 lost films